In computing, the Kogge–Stone adder (KSA or KS) is a parallel prefix form carry look-ahead adder.  Other parallel prefix adders (PPA) include the Sklansky adder (SA), Brent–Kung adder (BKA), the Han–Carlson adder (HCA), the fastest known variation, the Lynch–Swartzlander spanning tree adder (STA), Knowles adder (KNA) and Beaumont-Smith adder (BSA).

The Kogge–Stone adder takes more area to implement than the Brent–Kung adder, but has a lower fan-out at each stage, which increases performance for typical CMOS process nodes. However, wiring congestion is often a problem for Kogge–Stone adders.  The Lynch–Swartzlander design is smaller, has lower fan-out, and does not suffer from wiring congestion; however to be used the process node must support Manchester carry chain implementations.  The general problem of optimizing parallel prefix adders is identical to the variable block size, multi level, carry-skip adder optimization problem, a solution of which is found in Thomas Lynch's thesis of 1996.

An example of a 4-bit Kogge–Stone adder is shown in the diagram. Each vertical stage produces a "propagate" and a "generate" bit, as shown. The culminating generate bits (the carries) are produced in the last stage (vertically), and these bits are XOR'd with the initial propagate after the input (the red boxes) to produce the sum bits. E.g., the first (least-significant) sum bit is calculated by XORing the propagate in the farthest-right red box (a "1") with the carry-in (a "0"), producing a "1". The second bit is calculated by XORing the propagate in second box from the right (a "0") with C0 (a "0"), producing a "0".

4-bit Kogge-Stone adder, valency-2, without Cin:
 P00 = A0 XOR B0              '1dt, S0, dt - type delay time 
 G00 = A0 AND B0              '1dt, C0             
 P10 = A1 XOR B1              '1dt 
 G10 = A1 AND B1              '1dt
 P20 = A2 XOR B2              '1dt
 G20 = A2 AND B2              '1dt
 P30 = A3 XOR B3              '1dt
 G30 = A3 AND B3              '1dt
 'distance=2^0=1 
 G11 = G10 OR (P10 AND G00)   '3dt, C1, valency-2
 P21 = P20 AND P10            '2dt
 G21 = G20 OR (P20 AND G10)   '3dt
 P31 = P30 AND P20            '2dt
 G31 = G30 OR (P30 AND G20)   '3dt
 'distance=2^1=2
 G22 = G21 OR (P21 AND G00)   '5dt, C2, valency-2
 G32 = G31 OR (P31 AND G11)   '5dt, C3, valency-2
 
 S0 = P00                     '1dt 
 S1 = P10 XOR G00             '2dt
 S2 = P20 XOR G11             '4dt 
 S3 = P30 XOR G22             '6dt 
4-bit Kogge-Stone adder, valency-2,3,4 (is 4-bit CLA adder, valency-2,3,4):
 P00 = A0 XOR B0                    '1dt, S0
 G00 = A0 AND B0                    '1dt, C0
 P10 = A1 XOR B1                    '1dt
 G10 = A1 AND B1                    '1dt
 P20 = A2 XOR B2                    '1dt
 G20 = A2 AND B2                    '1dt
 P30 = A3 XOR B3                    '1dt
 G30 = A3 AND B3                    '1dt
 'distance=2^0=1
 G11 = G10 OR_
      (P10 AND G00)                 '3dt, C1, valency-2
 G21 = G20 OR_
      (P20 AND G10)                 '3dt,     valency-2
 G31 = G30 OR_
      (P30 AND G20)                 '3dt,     valency-2
 'distance=2^1=2  
 G22 = G20 OR_
      (P20 AND G10) OR_
      (P20 AND P10 AND G00)         '3dt, C2, valency-3
 G32 = G30 OR_
      (P30 AND G20) OR_
      (P30 AND P20 AND G10) OR_
      (P30 AND P20 AND P10 AND G00) '3dt, C3, valency-4
 
 S0 = P00                           '1dt
 S1 = P10 XOR G00                   '2dt
 S2 = P20 XOR G11                   '4dt
 S3 = P30 XOR G22                   '4dt
4-bit Kogge-Stone adder valency-2 with Cin:
 G0a = A0 AND Cin             '1dt
 G0b = B0 AND Cin             '1dt 
 G0c = A0 AND B0              '1dt
 
 P00 = A0 XOR B0              '1dt
 G00 = G0a OR G0b OR G0c      '2dt, C0    
 P10 = A1 XOR B1              '1dt  
 G10 = A1 AND B1              '1dt  
 P20 = A2 XOR B2              '1dt 
 G20 = A2 AND B2              '1dt
 P30 = A3 XOR B3              '1dt 
 G30 = A3 AND B3              '1dt
 
 G11 = G10 OR (P10 AND G00)   '4d, C1 
 P21 = P20 AND P10            '2dt
 G21 = G20 OR (P20 AND G10)   '3dt
 P31 = P30 AND P20            '2dt   
 G31 = G30 OR (P30 AND G20)   '3dt
 
 G22 = G21 OR (P21 AND G00)   '5dt, C2 
 G32 = G31 OR (P31 AND G11)   '5dt, C3, Cout 
 
 S0 = P00 XOR Cin             '2dt
 S1 = P10 XOR G00             '3dt
 S2 = P20 XOR G11             '5dt
 S3 = P30 XOR G22             '6dt
8-bit Kogge-Stone adder, valency-2:
 P00 = A0 XOR B0              '1dt, S0
 G00 = A0 AND B0              '1dt, C0
 P10 = A1 XOR B1              '1dt  
 G10 = A1 AND B1              '1dt 
 P20 = A2 XOR B2              '1dt
 G20 = A2 AND B2              '1dt 
 P30 = A3 XOR B3              '1dt
 G30 = A3 AND B3              '1dt
 P40 = A4 XOR B4              '1dt
 G40 = A4 AND B4              '1dt
 P50 = A5 XOR B5              '1dt
 G50 = A5 AND B5              '1dt  
 P60 = A6 XOR B6              '1dt
 G60 = A6 AND B6              '1dt
 P70 = A7 XOR B7              '1dt
 G70 = A7 AND B7              '1dt
 
 G11 = G10 OR (P10 AND G00)   '3dt, C1
 P21 = P20 AND P10            '2dt
 G21 = G20 OR (P20 AND G10)   '3dt
 P31 = P30 AND P20            '2dt
 G31 = G30 OR (P30 AND G20)   '3dt
 P41 = P40 AND P30            '2dt 
 G41 = G40 OR (P40 AND G30)   '3dt
 P51 = P50 AND P40            '2dt
 G51 = G50 OR (P50 AND G40)   '3dt
 P61 = P60 AND P50            '2dt
 G61 = G60 OR (P60 AND G50)   '3dt
 P71 = P70 AND P60            '2dt
 G71 = G70 OR (P70 AND G60)   '3dt
 
 G22 = G21 OR (P21 AND G00)   '5dt, C2
 G32 = G31 OR (P31 AND G11)   '5dt, C3
 P42 = P41 AND P21            '4dt
 G42 = G41 OR (P41 AND G21)   '5dt
 P52 = P51 AND P31            '4dt 
 G52 = G51 OR (P51 AND G31)   '5dt
 P62 = P61 AND P41            '4dt
 G62 = G61 OR (P61 AND G41)   '5dt
 P72 = P71 AND P51            '4dt
 G72 = G71 OR (P71 AND G51)   '5dt
 
 G43 = G42 OR (P42 AND G00)   '7dt, C4
 G53 = G52 OR (P52 AND G11)   '7dt, C5
 G63 = G62 OR (P62 AND G22)   '7dt, C6
 G73 = G72 OR (P72 AND G32)   '7dt, C7, Cout
 
 S0 = P00                     '1dt
 S1 = P10 XOR G00             '2dt
 S2 = P20 XOR G11             '4dt
 S3 = P30 XOR G22             '6dt
 S4 = P40 XOR G32             '6dt
 S5 = P50 XOR G43             '8dt
 S6 = P60 XOR G53             '8dt
 S7 = P70 XOR G63             '8dt
8-bit Kogge-Stone adder, valency-2,3,4:
 P00 = A0 XOR B0                    '1dt, S0
 G00 = A0 AND B0                    '1dt, C0
 P10 = A1 XOR B1                    '1dt
 G10 = A1 AND B1                    '1dt
 P20 = A2 XOR B2                    '1dt
 G20 = A2 AND B2                    '1dt
 P30 = A3 XOR B3                    '1dt
 G30 = A3 AND B3                    '1dt
 P40 = A4 XOR B4                    '1dt
 G40 = A4 AND B4                    '1dt
 P50 = A5 XOR B5                    '1dt
 G50 = A5 AND B5                    '1dt
 P60 = A6 XOR B6                    '1dt
 G60 = A6 AND B6                    '1dt
 P70 = A7 XOR B7                    '1dt
 G70 = A7 AND B7                    '1dt
 'distance=2^0=1
 G11 = G10 OR (P10 AND G00)         '3dt, valency-2, C1
 P21 = P20 AND P10                  '2dt
 G21 = G20 OR (P20 AND G10)         '3dt, valency-2
 P31 = P30 AND P20                  '2dt
 G31 = G30 OR (P30 AND G20)         '3dt, valency-2
 P41 = P40 AND P30                  '2dt
 G41 = G40 OR (P40 AND G30)         '3dt, valency-2
 P51 = P50 AND P40                  '2dt
 G51 = G50 OR (P50 AND G40)         '3dt, valency-2
 P61 = P60 AND P50                  '2dt
 G61 = G60 OR (P60 AND G50)         '3dt, valency-2
 P71 = P70 AND P60                  '2dt
 G71 = G70 OR (P70 AND G60)         '3dt, valency-2
 'distance=2^1=2
 G22 = G20 OR_
      (P20 AND G10) OR_
      (P20 AND P10 AND G00)         '3dt, valency-3, C2
 G32 = G30 OR_
      (P30 AND G20) OR_
      (P30 AND P20 AND G10) OR_
      (P30 AND P20 AND P10 AND G00) '3dt, valency-4, C3
 P42 = P41 AND P21                  '3dt 
 G42 = G40 OR_
      (P40 AND G30) OR_
      (P40 AND P30 AND G20) OR_
      (P40 AND P30 AND P20 AND G10) '3dt, valency-4
 P52 = P51 AND P31                  '3dt
 G52 = G50 OR_
      (P50 AND G40) OR_
      (P50 AND P40 AND G30) OR_
      (P50 AND P40 AND P30 AND G20) '3dt, valency-4
 P62 = P61 AND P41                  '3dt
 G62 = G60 OR_
      (P60 AND G50) OR_
      (P60 AND P50 AND G40) OR_
      (P60 AND P50 AND P40 AND G30) '3dt, valency-4
 P72 = P71 AND P51
 G72 = G70 OR_
      (P70 AND G60) OR_
      (P70 AND P60 AND G50) OR_
      (P70 AND P60 AND P50 AND G40) '3dt, valency-4
 'distance=2^2=4
 G43 = G42 OR (P42 AND G00)         '5dt, valency-2, C4
 G53 = G52 OR (P52 AND G11)         '5dt, valency-2, C5
 G63 = G62 OR (P62 AND G22)         '5dt, valency-2, C6
 G73 = G72 OR (P72 AND G32)         '5dt, valency-2, C7
 
 S0 = P00                           '1dt
 S1 = P10 XOR G00                   '2dt
 S2 = P20 XOR G11                   '4dt
 S3 = P30 XOR G22                   '4dt
 S4 = P40 XOR G32                   '6dt
 S5 = P50 XOR G43                   '6dt
 S6 = P60 XOR G53                   '6dt
 S7 = P70 XOR G63                   '6dt
8-bit Kogge-Stone adder, valency-2,3,4,5,6,7,8:
 P00 = A0 XOR B0                    '1dt, S0
 G00 = A0 AND B0                    '1dt, C0
 P10 = A1 XOR B1                    '1dt
 G10 = A1 AND B1                    '1dt
 P20 = A2 XOR B2                    '1dt
 G20 = A2 AND B2                    '1dt
 P30 = A3 XOR B3                    '1dt
 G30 = A3 AND B3                    '1dt
 P40 = A4 XOR B4                    '1dt
 G40 = A4 AND B4                    '1dt
 P50 = A5 XOR B5                    '1dt
 G50 = A5 AND B5                    '1dt
 P60 = A6 XOR B6                    '1dt
 G60 = A6 AND B6                    '1dt
 P70 = A7 XOR B7                    '1dt
 G70 = A7 AND B7                    '1dt
 'distance=2^0=1---------------------------------------
 G11 = G10 OR (P10 AND G00)         '3dt, valency-2, C1
 P21 = P20 AND P10                  '2dt
 G21 = G20 OR (P20 AND G10)         '3dt, valency-2
 P31 = P30 AND P20                  '2dt
 G31 = G30 OR (P30 AND G20)         '3dt, valency-2
 P41 = P40 AND P30                  '2dt
 G41 = G40 OR (P40 AND G30)         '3dt, valency-2
 P51 = P50 AND P40                  '2dt
 G51 = G50 OR (P50 AND G40)         '3dt, valency-2
 P61 = P60 AND P50                  '2dt
 G61 = G60 OR (P60 AND G50)         '3dt, valency-2
 P71 = P70 AND P60                  '2dt
 G71 = G70 OR (P70 AND G60)         '3dt, valency-2
 'distance=2^1=2---------------------------------------
 G22 = G20 OR_                      '3dt, valency-3, C2
      (P20 AND G10) OR_
      (P20 AND P10 AND G00)
 G32 = G30 OR_                      '3dt, valency-4, C3
      (P30 AND G20) OR_
      (P30 AND P20 AND G10) OR_
      (P30 AND P20 AND P10 AND G00)
 P42 = P41 AND P21                  '3dt
 G42 = G40 OR_                      '3dt, valency-4
      (P40 AND G30) OR_
      (P40 AND P30 AND G20) OR_
      (P40 AND P30 AND P20 AND G10)
 P52 = P51 AND P31                  '3dt
 G52 = G50 OR_                      '3dt, valency-4
      (P50 AND G40) OR_
      (P50 AND P40 AND G30) OR_
      (P50 AND P40 AND P30 AND G20)
 P62 = P61 AND P41                  '3dt
 G62 = G60 OR_                      '3dt, valency=4
      (P60 AND G50) OR_
      (P60 AND P50 AND G40) OR_
      (P60 AND P50 AND P40 AND G30)
 P72 = P71 AND P51                  '3dt
 G72 = G70 OR_                      '3dt, valency-4
      (P70 AND G60) OR_
      (P70 AND P60 AND G50) OR_
      (P70 AND P60 AND P50 AND G40)
 'distance=2^2=4---------------------------------------
 G43 = G40 OR_                      '3dt, valency-5, C4
      (P40 AND G30) OR_
      (P40 AND P30 AND G20) OR_
      (P40 AND P30 AND P20 AND G10) OR_
      (P40 AND P30 AND P20 AND P10 AND G00)
 G53 = G50 OR_                      '3dt, valency-6, C5 
      (P50 AND G40) OR_             
      (P50 AND P40 AND G30) OR_
      (P50 AND P40 AND P30 AND G20) OR_
      (P50 AND P40 AND P30 AND P20 AND G10) OR_
      (P50 AND P40 AND P30 AND P20 AND P10 AND G00)
 G63 = G60 OR_                      '3dt, valency-7, C6
      (P60 AND G50) OR_             
      (P60 AND P50 AND G40) OR_
      (P60 AND P50 AND P40 AND G30) OR_
      (P60 AND P50 AND P40 AND P30 AND G20) OR_
      (P60 AND P50 AND P40 AND P30 AND P20 AND G10) OR_
      (P60 AND P50 AND P40 AND P30 AND P20 AND P10 AND G00)
 G73 = G70 OR_                      '3dt, valency-8, C7
      (P70 AND G60) OR_             
      (P70 AND P60 AND G50) OR_
      (P70 AND P60 AND P50 AND G40) OR_
      (P70 AND P60 AND P50 AND P40 AND G30) OR_
      (P70 AND P60 AND P50 AND P40 AND P30 AND G20) OR_
      (P70 AND P60 AND P50 AND P40 AND P30 AND P20 AND G10) OR_
      (P70 AND P60 AND P50 AND P40 AND P30 AND P20 AND P10 AND G00)
 '--------------------------------------
 S0 = P00                           '1dt
 S1 = P10 XOR G00                   '2dt
 S2 = P20 XOR G11                   '4dt
 S3 = P30 XOR G22                   '4dt
 S4 = P40 XOR G32                   '4dt
 S5 = P50 XOR G43                   '4dt
 S6 = P60 XOR G53                   '4dt
 S7 = P70 XOR G63                   '4dt
The Kogge-Stone adder concept was developed by Peter M. Kogge and Harold S. Stone, who published it in a seminal 1973 paper titled A Parallel Algorithm for the Efficient Solution of a General Class of Recurrence Equations.

Enhancements 

Enhancements to the original implementation include increasing the radix and sparsity of the adder. The radix of the adder refers to how many results from the previous level of computation are used to generate the next one. The original implementation uses radix-2, although it's possible to create radix-4 and higher. Doing so increases the power and delay of each stage, but reduces the number of required stages. In the so-called sparse Kogge–Stone adder (SKA) the sparsity of the adder refers to how many carry bits are generated by the carry-tree. Generating every carry bit is called sparsity-1, whereas generating every other is sparsity-2 and every fourth is sparsity-4. The resulting carries are then used as the carry-in inputs for much shorter ripple carry adders or some other adder design, which generates the final sum bits. Increasing sparsity reduces the total needed computation and can reduce the amount of routing congestion.

Above is an example of a Kogge–Stone adder with sparsity-4. Elements eliminated by sparsity shown marked with transparency. As shown, power and area of the carry generation is improved significantly, and routing congestion is substantially reduced. Each generated carry feeds a multiplexer for a carry select adder or the carry-in of a ripple carry adder.

16-bit Kogge-Stone adder valency-2 without Cin:
  P00 =  A0 XOR  B0               '1dt, S0, dt - type delay time
  G00 =  A0 AND  B0               '1dt, C0
  P10 =  A1 XOR  B1               '1dt   
  G10 =  A1 AND  B1               '1dt
  P20 =  A2 XOR  B2               '1dt 
  G20 =  A2 AND  B2               '1dt  
  P30 =  A3 XOR  B3               '1dt
  G30 =  A3 AND  B3               '1dt
  P40 =  A4 XOR  B4               '1dt
  G40 =  A4 AND  B4               '1dt
  P50 =  A5 XOR  B5               '1dt  
  G50 =  A5 AND  B5               '1dt
  P60 =  A6 XOR  B6               '1dt
  G60 =  A6 AND  B6               '1dt 
  P70 =  A7 XOR  B7               '1dt
  G70 =  A7 AND  B7               '1dt 
  P80 =  A8 XOR  B8               '1dt
  G80 =  A8 AND  B8               '1dt   
  P90 =  A9 XOR  B9               '1dt  
  G90 =  A9 AND  B9               '1dt
 P100 = A10 XOR B10               '1dt
 G100 = A10 AND B10               '1dt
 P110 = A11 XOR B11               '1dt
 G110 = A11 AND B11               '1dt  
 P120 = A12 XOR B12               '1dt
 G120 = A12 AND B12               '1dt
 P130 = A13 XOR B13               '1dt 
 G130 = A13 AND B13               '1dt
 P140 = A14 XOR B14               '1dt  
 G140 = A14 AND B14               '1dt
 P150 = A15 XOR B15               '1dt 
 G150 = A15 AND B15               '1dt
 
  G11 =  G10 OR ( P10 AND  G00)   '3dt, C1
  P21 =  P20 AND  P10             '2dt
  G21 =  G20 OR ( P20 AND  G10)   '3dt
  P31 =  P30 AND  P20             '2dt
  G31 =  G30 OR ( P30 AND  G20)   '3dt
  P41 =  P40 AND  P30             '2dt 
  G41 =  G40 OR ( P40 AND  G30)   '3dt
  P51 =  P50 AND  P40             '2dt 
  G51 =  G50 OR ( P50 AND  G40)   '3dt
  P61 =  P60 AND  P50             '2dt
  G61 =  G60 OR ( P60 AND  G50)   '3dt
  P71 =  P70 AND  P60             '2dt
  G71 =  G70 OR ( P70 AND  G60)   '3dt
  P81 =  P80 AND  P70             '2dt   
  G81 =  G80 OR ( P80 AND  G70)   '3dt
  P91 =  P90 AND  P80             '2dt 
  G91 =  G90 OR ( P90 AND  G80)   '3dt
 P101 = P100 AND  P90             '2dt 
 G101 = G100 OR (P100 AND  G90)   '3dt 
 P111 = P110 AND P100             '2dt  
 G111 = G110 OR (P110 AND G100)   '3dt
 P121 = P120 AND P110             '2dt
 G121 = G120 OR (P120 AND G110)   '3dt
 P131 = P130 AND P120             '2dt
 G131 = G130 OR (P130 AND G120)   '3dt
 P141 = P140 AND P130             '2dt
 G141 = G140 OR (P140 AND G130)   '3dt
 P151 = P150 AND P140             '2dt
 G151 = G150 OR (P150 AND G140)   '3dt
 
  G22 =  G21 OR ( P21 AND  G00)   '5dt, C2
  G32 =  G31 OR ( P31 AND  G11)   '5dt, C3
  P42 =  P41 AND  P21             '3dt
  G42 =  G41 OR ( P41 AND  G21)   '5dt
  P52 =  P51 AND  P31             '3dt
  G52 =  G51 OR ( P51 AND  G31)   '5dt
  P62 =  P61 AND  P41             '3dt
  G62 =  G61 OR ( P61 AND  G41)   '5dt
  P72 =  P71 AND  P51             '3dt
  G72 =  G71 OR ( P71 AND  G51)   '5dt
  P82 =  P81 AND  P61             '3dt
  G82 =  G81 OR ( P81 AND  G61)   '5dt
  P92 =  P91 AND  P71             '3dt
  G92 =  G91 OR ( P91 AND  G71)   '5dt
 P102 = P101 AND  P81             '3dt
 G102 = G101 OR (P101 AND  G81)   '5dt
 P112 = P111 AND  P91             '3dt  
 G112 = G111 OR (P111 AND  G91)   '5dt
 P122 = P121 AND P101             '3dt
 G122 = G121 OR (P121 AND G101)   '5dt
 P132 = P131 AND P111             '3dt
 G132 = G131 OR (P131 AND G111)   '5dt
 P142 = P141 AND P121             '3dt
 G142 = G141 OR (P141 AND G121)   '5dt
 P152 = P151 AND P131             '3dt 
 G152 = G151 OR (P151 AND G131)   '5dt
 
  G43 =  G42 OR ( P42 AND  G00)   '7dt, C4
  G53 =  G52 OR ( P52 AND  G11)   '7dt, C5
  G63 =  G62 OR ( P62 AND  G22)   '7dt, C6
  G73 =  G72 OR ( P72 AND  G32)   '7dt, C7
  P83 =  P82 AND  P42             '4dt
  G83 =  G82 OR ( P82 AND  G42)   '7dt
  P93 =  P92 AND  P52             '4dt
  G93 =  G92 OR ( P92 AND  G52)   '7dt
 P103 = P102 AND  P62             '4dt
 G103 = G102 OR (P102 AND  G62)   '7dt 
 P113 = P112 AND  P72             '4dt
 G113 = G112 OR (P112 AND  G72)   '7dt
 P123 = P122 AND  P82             '4dt  
 G123 = G122 OR (P122 AND  G82)   '7dt
 P133 = P132 AND  P92             '4dt
 G133 = G132 OR (P132 AND  G92)   '7dt
 P143 = P142 AND P102             '4dt
 G143 = G142 OR (P142 AND G102)   '7dt
 P153 = P152 AND P112             '4dt
 G153 = G152 OR (P152 AND G112)   '7dt
 
  G84 =  G83 OR ( P83 AND G00)    '9dt, C8
  G94 =  G93 OR ( P93 AND G11)    '9dt, C9
 G104 = G103 OR (P103 AND G22)    '9dt, C10
 G114 = G113 OR (P113 AND G32)    '9dt, C11
 G124 = G123 OR (P123 AND G43)    '9dt, C12
 G134 = G133 OR (P133 AND G53)    '9dt, C13
 G144 = G143 OR (P143 AND G63)    '9dt, C14
 G154 = G153 OR (P153 AND G73)    '9dt, C15
 
  S0 =  P00                       '1dt
  S1 =  P10 XOR  G00              '2dt
  S2 =  P20 XOR  G11              '4dt
  S3 =  P30 XOR  G22              '6dt
  S4 =  P40 XOR  G32              '6dt
  S5 =  P50 XOR  G43              '8dt
  S6 =  P60 XOR  G53              '8dt
  S7 =  P70 XOR  G63              '8dt 
  S8 =  P80 XOR  G73              '8dt
  S9 =  P90 XOR  G84              '10dt
 S10 = P100 XOR  G94              '10dt 
 S11 = P110 XOR G104              '10dt
 S12 = P120 XOR G114              '10dt
 S13 = P130 XOR G124              '10dt
 S14 = P140 XOR G134              '10dt
 S15 = P150 XOR G144              '10dt

References

Further reading
 

Adders (electronics)